Kenga may refer to:

David Kenga (born 1982), Kenyan soccer player who plays for Indiana Invaders in the USL Premier Development League
Tongla Kenga, town in Mongar District in southeastern-central Bhutan
Kenga language, spoken in Chad
Kenga Khachmas, a village and municipality in the Khachmaz District of Azerbaijan
Kënga Magjike, annual music competition organised by Albanian television broadcaster Televizioni Klan

See also
Kanga (disambiguation)